Anthony Charles Sousa  (born September 27, 1958) is a Canadian politician who has served as the Member of Parliament from Mississauga-Lakeshore since December 12, 2022. He previously served as the Minister of Finance for Ontario from 2013 to 2018. A member of the Ontario Liberal Party, Sousa was elected to represent Missisuaga South in the Legislative Assembly of Ontario in 2007. He joined the provincial cabinet as the minister of labour in 2010 and became Ontario's minister of citizenship and immigration in 2011. In 2022, Sousa ran as the federal Liberal candidate in the Mississauga-Lakeshore by-election which was held on December 12, 2022. Sousa won the election, defeating 39 other candidates.

Early life, career and education
Sousa is the son of Portuguese immigrants. He grew up in Mississauga and graduated from Wilfrid Laurier University in 1982 with a degree in Business Administration. In 1991, he completed a fellowship at the Institute of Canadian Bankers. He then earned an Executive MBA from the Richard Ivey School of Business at the University of Western Ontario in 1994. He worked at Royal Bank of Canada (RBC) Financial Group for more than 20 years, primarily as Director Commercial Banking and Director Marketing at RBC Dominion Securities. Prior to working with RBC, he owned and operated a factoring company that offered asset base financing to small businesses.

Sousa has been a member of the Canadian Chamber of Commerce, a director with the United States Chamber of Commerce and a member of the Toronto Board of Trade. In 2003, he was appointed to represent Canada as a director to the International Chamber of Commerce. He is a past president of the Federation of Portuguese Canadian Business and Professionals Federation of Portuguese-Canadian Business & Professionals and member of the European Union Chamber of Commerce in Toronto (EUCOCIT). He was also an ambassador for the Credit Valley Hospital Foundation and an honorary chair of the Rainbow Ball Foundation.

In 2003, Sousa received a Queen's Golden Jubilee Medal in recognition of his service to the community. In 2009, he was inducted as a Commander (Comendador) to the Order of Merit, and in 2012 he received the Queen's Diamond Jubilee Medal. In 2015, Sousa was also ranked as nobleman to the Confraria Port Wines. He lives in Clarkson with his wife Zenaida and their three children.

Early involvement in politics
Sousa served as one of 29 co-chairs for John Tory's campaign for mayor of Toronto in the 2003 election, being part of the leadership of the group "Grits for Tory". Toronto municipal elections are officially non-partisan, however, Tory was a prominent member of the Progressive Conservative (PC) Party.

Sousa ran against sitting Mississauga South member of Parliament (MP) Paul Szabo for the federal Liberal nomination in 2004, but was defeated in a tightly fought but amicable campaign. This would mark the start of a long-running rivalry between Sousa and Szabo for influence in that riding. In 2014 Sousa backed Sven Spengemann for the federal Liberal nomination against Szabo's preferred candidate, Julie Desjardins with Spengemann winning by only 19 votes as Szabo and Desjardins felt that the nomination was stolen. In the 2018 provincial election, Szabo backed PC party candidate Rudy Cuzzetto.

Sousa ran for the federal Liberal nomination in Mississauga—Erindale in 2006 but was defeated as well.

Provincial politics

Entering provincial politics 
Sousa won the riding of Mississauga South in the 2007 provincial election, defeating incumbent Tim Peterson. Formerly a Liberal, Peterson had crossed the floor in March 2007 to join the Progressive Conservative Party of Ontario (PC Party). Analysts had expected the vote to be extremely close, but Sousa ultimately won the riding with 46.8 per cent of the popular vote, a margin of just over 5,000 votes more than Peterson. He was re-elected in 2011 and 2014.

He was appointed as a parliamentary assistant to three different ministries before Dalton McGuinty promoted him to cabinet in 2010 as Minister of Labour. In October 2011, he was moved to the position of Minister of Citizenship and Immigration. He was also made minister responsible for the PanAm/ParapanAm Games.

In 2008, Sousa introduced a private member's bill to track and report industrial, commercial and institutional (IC&I) waste. He also introduced a private member's resolution to improve financial literacy education amongst youth. He also facilitated passage of the Payday Loans Act to protect Ontario consumers against predatory lending.

In 2011, he introduced and passed Bill 160 – the Occupational Health and Safety Statute Law Amendment Act to create a Chief Prevention Officer and a new prevention council within Ontario's Ministry of Labour. He also introduced and received unanimous support for Bill 181, the Fire Protection and Prevention Amendment Act (2011), addressing protection for Ontario firefighters and duty of fair representation.

In November 2012, he resigned from his cabinet positions in order to contest the 2013 Liberal leadership convention to choose McGuinty's successor. Sousa came in fifth place with 9.8% of the vote on the second ballot after which he withdrew to endorse Kathleen Wynne who went on to win the leadership of the party and the title of Premier of Ontario.

In February 2013, when Wynne officially took over as Premier, she named Sousa as her Minister of Finance. In May 2013, Sousa also assumed the role of Management Board Chair when Harinder Takhar suffered a minor heart attack.

Sousa was defeated in the 2018 provincial election in the renamed riding of Mississauga—Lakeshore by businessman Rudy Cuzzetto.

Following his defeat, he considered running in the 2018 election for Peel Region chair, though he ultimately sat the race out in order to avoid splitting the vote with Bob Delaney, the former Liberal MPP for Mississauga—Streetsville. Following Wynne's 2018 resignation, Sousa was seen as a possible candidate in the subsequent leadership election, though he declined to run.

Minister of Finance
As Minister of Finance, Sousa developed five deficit budgets and one balanced budget, including: A Prosperous & Fair Ontario (2013); Building Opportunity, Securing Our Future (2014); Building Ontario Up (2015); Jobs for Today and Tomorrow (2016); A Stronger, Healthier Ontario (2017); 2018 Ontario Budget: A Plan for Care and Opportunity; and corresponding Fall Economic Statements. In 2014 and in 2017, Sousa also tabled a Long Term Report on the Ontario Economy. He led Ontario's biggest shakeup to beverage alcohol retailing since Prohibition ended in 1927 by introducing beer and cider to grocery stores, and later wine.

Sousa spearheaded Ontario's leadership on increasing personal contributions and benefits to the Canadian Pension Plan, which ultimately led to a national agreement in principle to enhance the Canada Pension Plan. The Government of Ontario previously intended on introducing a provincial pension plan if the CPP was not expanded. He has also led the establishment of the Cooperative Capital Markets  Regulator.

Under Sousa's mandate, the Trillium Trust was put in place to support the largest investment in public infrastructure in Ontario's history: $160 billion over 12 years, supporting 110,000 jobs across the province every year.

In February 2016, Sousa claimed the government intends to balance the $137 billion budget in 2017–2018 following nine consecutive deficits for the province. Most recently, the 2016 Budget announced an improved deficit target of 4.3 billion in 2016–2017, a return to balance in 2017–2018 and continued balance in 2018–2019. Since Sousa became Finance Minister in 2013 the provincial net debt has risen from $252.1 billion to $305.2 billion.

In November 2016, Sousa released the 2017 Fall Economic Statement, which continued to project a balanced budget in 2017–2018, and projects a balance in 2018–2019 and 2019–2020. The statement also marked the eighth consecutive year that the government had beaten its deficit targets. The statement also announced a list of new initiatives, including the launch of previously announced initiatives like OHIP+, increased minimum wage, and supports for seniors. The statement announced new small business tax cuts, as well as cost-lowering initiatives and supports for business who hire young people.

In June 2016, Sousa, through negotiations with the federal Ministry of Finance and other provinces, signed a deal to replace the planned ORPP with an enhanced CPP, The Ontario government, along with other provinces, had been pushing for an enhanced CPP since 2013, quoting studies showing that middle-class Canadians were not saving enough for retirement. The Conservative government of Prime Minister Stephen Harper did not want to discuss the idea. That lack of co-operation from Ottawa prompted Wynne to promise the ORPP, but she emphasized Ontario would abandon that plan if a deal to enhance the CPP could be reached.

In November 2016, Sousa announced plans to create a new regulator in the province to consolidate and strengthen oversight of credit unions, mortgage brokers, provincial pension plans and provincially registered insurers. The creation of the Financial Services Regulatory Authority (FSRA) was a key recommendation of an expert panel on financial regulation convened by the Ontario government.

In April 2017, Sousa released the 2017 Ontario Budget. As his government promised when elected in 2014, the budget was the Ontario's first balanced budget since the 2008 global recession. The budget announced new government initiatives like free prescription medications for everyone 24 and under (dubbed OHIP+), free tuition for 210,000+ post-secondary students, a 25% cut to energy bills via the Fair Hydro Plan, housing affordability measures through the Fair Housing Plan, the Ontario Seniors' Public Transit Tax Credit, and increased investment for healthcare and education. Included in the budget, but announced previously, were initiatives like a plan to study basic income with pilot projects in 3 cities, and a pledge to open 100,000 new child-care spaces with a quarter of those spots set to open in 2017.

On March 28, 2018, Sousa released the 2018 Ontario Budget: A Plan for Care and Opportunity. In the document, the Minister announced a new drug and dental coverage for Ontarians without employer health plans, free preschool child care for children aged two-and-a-half until junior kindergarten, billions in both hospital capital funding, and hundreds of millions in operational funding. Also included in the 2018 budget was new mental health funding, new home-care funding for seniors, and new funding for developmentally disabled adults, among other initiatives.

As Minister of Finance, Sousa had following agencies under his direction: Deposit Insurance Corporation of Ontario, Financial Services Commission of Ontario, Financial Services Tribunal, Liquor Control Board of Ontario, Ontario Electricity Financial Corporation, Ontario Financing Authority, Ontario Lottery and Gaming Corporation and the Ontario Securities Commission.

Federal politics
On November 5, 2022, it was announced that Sousa would run as the federal Liberal candidate in the Mississauga—Lakeshore by-election scheduled for December 12, 2022. The riding had been vacated earlier in the year following the resignation of Liberal MP Sven Spengemann in order to accept a position with the United Nations. Sousa comfortably won the election, defeating Conservative candidate Ron Chhinzer.

Electoral record

Federal elections

Provincial elections

References

External links

1958 births
Canadian people of Portuguese descent
Living people
Members of the Executive Council of Ontario
Ontario Liberal Party MPPs
Politicians from Mississauga
Politicians from Toronto
University of Western Ontario alumni
Wilfrid Laurier University alumni
Finance ministers of Ontario
21st-century Canadian politicians
Liberal Party of Canada MPs
Members of the House of Commons of Canada from Ontario